Ophichthus hirritus is an eel in the family Ophichthidae (worm/snake eels). It was described by John E. McCosker in 2010. It is a marine, deep water-dwelling eel which is known from the Seychelles Islands, in the western Indian Ocean.

The species epithet "hirritus" means "to snarl like a dog" in Latin, and refers to the eel's facial structure.

References

hirritus
Taxa named by John E. McCosker
Fish described in 2010